Sebastian Spence (born December 9, 1969) is a Canadian actor. He played the lead role of Cade Foster in the Space Channel science fiction television series, First Wave (1998–2001).

Early life
Spence was born in St. John's, Newfoundland to Michael Cook and Janis Spence, both playwrights. His first professional acting job was at age 16, in a play written by his mother.

Career
Spence's first on-camera role was in second part of the Canadian television miniseries, The Boys of St. Vincent, which was well-received by critics. His next role was in the trilogy of A Family of Cops television movies with Charles Bronson, playing Eddie Fein the younger son of Bronson's character.

Spence's first film role was in the futuristic Anchor Zone, which was filmed in his native Newfoundland. performed in a substantial role in the film Drive, She Said in 1997; the film's storyline and staging were criticized by reviewers. Spence's first leading role was as Cade Foster, in the Space Channel (and later Sci-Fi Channel) original series, First Wave, which ran between 1998 and 2001. 

Spence played the role of Cliff Harting on the Hallmark Channel drama Cedar Cove, between 2013 and 2015.

Filmography

Film

Television

References

External links

The Official Online Website of Sebastian Spence

1969 births
Canadian male film actors
Canadian male television actors
Canadian male voice actors
People from St. John's, Newfoundland and Labrador
Living people
Male actors from Newfoundland and Labrador